Bernard Cohn may refer to:

 Bernard Cohn (politician) (1835–1889), American businessman and politician in Los Angeles
 Bernard Cohn (anthropologist) (1928–2003), anthropologist and scholar of British colonialism in India

See also 
 Bernard Cohen (disambiguation)